Elena Cristina Cáceres González (born 31 October 1986), known as Cristina Cáceres, is a former Salvadoran footballer who played as a defender. She has been a member of the El Salvador women's national team.

International career
Cáceres capped for El Salvador at senior level during the 2010 CONCACAF Women's World Cup Qualifying qualification and the 2012 CONCACAF Women's Olympic Qualifying Tournament qualification.

See also
List of El Salvador women's international footballers

References

1986 births
Living people
Salvadoran women's footballers
Women's association football defenders
El Salvador women's international footballers